Osmoderma eremicola, also known as the hermit beetle, is a species of scarab beetle in the family Scarabaeidae. It is found in North America. Large (21–32 mm), shiny, and dark brown, it can be found in wooded areas around tree trunks, and is said to give off a "leathery odor." It occurs from southern Canada through the U.S. mid-west and east to Georgia.

References

Further reading

External links

 

Cetoniinae
Articles created by Qbugbot
Beetles described in 1801